Coscinesthes is a genus of longhorn beetles of the subfamily Lamiinae, containing the following species:

 Coscinesthes minuta Pu, 1985
 Coscinesthes porosa Bates, 1890
 Coscinesthes salicis Gressitt, 1951

References

Lamiini